Route 227 (Kvish 227)  is a  road in the eastern Negev desert of Israel. It starts from an intersection with Route 206 in the northwest and ends in Ir Ovot in the southeast, intersecting with Highway 90. It has one at-grade intersection at 19 km. The original road (since upgraded) was laid by British land surveyors in 1927. Prior to 1956, this was the primary route from Beersheba to Eilat.

Scorpions' Pass (Ma'ale Akrabbim, lit.

Scorpions' Pass is a recognized heritage site in Israel.

History

Antiquity
The Roman Empire built the ascent in the late 1st century CE from the Wadi Zin to the highlands of the northern Negev desert during their control of the Middle East. Under British control, the ascent was slightly rebuilt to the north.

During the Nabatean period, the route became a part of the Spice Route.

The Scorpion Path is mentioned in the Books of Numbers, Joshua, and Judges, in the  Hebrew Bible, as the southern border of the territory given to the Tribe of Judah, and the southern border of the Promised Land overall.

State of Israel
Route 227 passes through a series of nature reserves: Mishor Yamim, HaMakhtesh HaKatan, Makteshim-Ein Yahav and the Judean Desert.

The Ma'ale Akrabim section of the road was declared dangerous and has been closed to traffic since 2017. Below the pass there is an abyss, and the road has no guard rails. In addition, the road has extreme dropoffs of hundreds of metres.

The Israeli Army Corps of Engineers paved it in 1950. It was again repaved in 2004. The National Roads Company of Israel is de facto responsible for the road.

See also 
 Ma'ale Akrabim massacre

References

227